The 2016 Intermediate League World Series took place from July 31–August 7 in Livermore, California, United States. Wailuku, Hawaii defeated Seoul, South Korea in the championship game.

Teams

Results

United States Bracket

International Bracket

Consolation Round

Elimination Round

References

Intermediate League World Series
Intermediate League World Series